Pacific Gold is an American Christian music band from Seattle, Washington. Their members include Torry Anderson, Brian Hibbard, Dan Koch, John Raines, and David Stuart. The band independently released its debut EPs, The River and The Holly & the Ivy, in 2012. A third extended play, Pacific Gold, was released in 2013. Their first studio album, Sing My Welcome Home, was released by BC Music in 2015.

Background
Pacific Gold is a Christian music band from Seattle, Washington. Their members are vocalist and keyboardist Torry Anderson, vocalist and lead guitarist Brian Hibbard, lead vocalist and guitarist Dan Koch, bassist John Raines, and drummer David Stuart.

Music history
The band commenced as a musical entity in 2012, with their first release, The River, an extended play, that was released on July 22, 2012,  independently. They released, another extended play, independently, The Holly & the Ivy, on November 27, 2012. The subsequent release, yet another extended play, was released independently on November 19, 2013. Their first studio album, Sing My Welcome Home, was released on March 24, 2015, by Bad Christian Music.

Members
Current members
 Torry Anderson – vocals, keys
 Brian Hibbard – vocals, lead guitar
 Dan Koch – lead vocals, guitar
 John Raines – bass
 David Stuart – drums

Discography
Studio albums
 Sing My Welcome Home (March 24, 2015, Bad Christian Music/BC Music)
EPs
 The River (July 22, 2012, Independent)
 The Holly & the Ivy (November 27, 2012, Independent)
 Pacific Gold (November 19, 2013, Independent)

References

External links
 Official website

Musical groups from Washington (state)
2012 establishments in Washington (state)
Musical groups established in 2012